Justin Allgood (born June 11, 1983) is a former American football quarterback who played two seasons in the Arena Football League (AFL) with the Tulsa Talons and Philadelphia Soul. He played college football at Trinity Valley Community College and Central Oklahoma.

Early years
Allgood played baseball and football at The Colony High School in The Colony, Texas. He was a two-time All-District football selection and an honorable mention All-Stater. He was also a second-team All-District selection in baseball.

College career
Allgood garnered 4,056 passing yards and 32 touchdowns in two years playing for the Trinity Valley Community College Cardinals. He earned first-team All-Conference honors as a freshman.

Allgood transferred to play football for the University of Central Oklahoma Bronchos of the University of Central Oklahoma. He was one of seven players nominated from the Southwest Region for the Harlon Hill Trophy in 2004. Allgood was the first player in University of Central Oklahoma history to throw for 300-plus yards in three straight games. He was also a second-team All-Lone Star Conference North Division selection in 2004 and 2005. He was named the Lone Star Conference Preseason Offensive Player of the Year in 2005. Allgood finished his career at the University of Central Oklahoma with 4,870 passing yards and 34 touchdowns.

Professional career
Allgood was rated the 67th best quarterback in the 2006 NFL Draft by NFLDraftScout.com.

Allgood spent the 2006 season with the Oklahoma City Yard Dawgz of AF2.

Allgood joined the Tulsa Talons in 2007 when they were a member of the AF2. He quarterbacked the Talons to a 73–66 victory on August 25, 2007 in ArenaCup VIII against the Wilkes-Barre/Scranton Pioneers.

Allgood was signed by the Philadelphia Soul on October 14, 2010. He was traded to the Tulsa Talons on May 17, 2011 for Rodney Wright.

AFL statistics

Stats from ArenaFan:

References

External links
Just Sports Stats
Fanbase profile

Living people
1983 births
Players of American football from Texas
American football quarterbacks
Trinity Valley Cardinals football players
Central Oklahoma Bronchos football players
Oklahoma City Yard Dawgz players
Tulsa Talons players
Philadelphia Soul players
People from The Colony, Texas